Podnemić is a village in Serbia. It is situated in the Ljubovija municipality, in the Mačva District of Central Serbia. The village had an entirely Serbian population of 420 in 2002.

Historical population

1948: 766
1953: 786
1961: 706
1971: 588
1981: 492
1991: 448
2002: 420

See also
List of places in Serbia

References

Populated places in Mačva District
Ljubovija